Steinbergkirche is a municipality in the district of Schleswig-Flensburg, in Schleswig-Holstein, Germany.

Steinbergkirche is the seat of the Amt ("collective municipality") Geltinger Bucht.

References

Schleswig-Flensburg